Nimrod Elireheema Mkono (born 18 August 1943) is a Tanzanian CCM politician and Member of Parliament for Musoma Rural constituency since 2000. He is also a practicing advocate.

References

1943 births
Living people
Chama Cha Mapinduzi MPs
Tanzanian MPs 2000–2005
Tanzanian MPs 2005–2010
Tanzanian MPs 2010–2015
Tabora Boys Secondary School alumni
Shinyanga Secondary School alumni
University of Dar es Salaam alumni